Atlantic Coast Line 1504 is a 4-6-2 steam locomotive built in March 1919 by the American Locomotive Company (ALCO) of Richmond, Virginia, for the Atlantic Coast Line Railroad (ACL) as a member of the P-5-A class under the United States Railroad Administration (USRA) standard. No. 1504 was assigned to pull ACL's premier main line passenger trains during the 1920s to early 40s and even main line freight trains in the late 1940s until it was retired from revenue service at the end of 1952. 

In 1960, No. 1504 was subsequently donated to the city of Jacksonville, Florida, where it sat on static display as the only original USRA Light Pacific steam locomotive to be preserved. In 1990, it was designated as a National Historic Mechanical Engineering Landmark by the American Society of Mechanical Engineers (ASME). No. 1504 was cosmetically restored three times in 1989, 1998, and 2015.

As of 2023, the No. 1504 locomotive is currently being restored to operating condition for use in excursion service on the South Central Florida Express shortline railroad in Clewiston, Florida as part of U.S. Sugar's (USSC) heritage tourist passenger train named the Sugar Express, where it will eventually run alongside ex-Florida East Coast Railway (FEC) No. 148.

History

Design and abilities

No. 1504 was the fifth member of 70 United States Railroad Administration (USRA) Light Pacifics built by American Locomotive Company (ALCO) between 1919 and 1920 as the standard main line passenger steam locomotives for the Atlantic Coast Line Railroad (ACL). Originally classified as a P-5 and numbered 497, it was reclassified as a P-5-A and renumbered to 1504 in 1920.

Their tender was equipped with a coal pusher, which was operated by steam to push the coal for the fireman shoveling it into the firebox. While some of the P-5-As were re-equipped with Worthington feedwater heaters, disc driving wheels, and larger tenders to improve their performances, No. 1504 was one of the few that were not re-equipped with these features.

No. 1504 and the P-5-As were assigned to haul ACL's premier main line passenger trains such as the Champion, the Dixie Flyer, the Florida Special, the Everglades Limited, the Havana Special, the Miamian, the Palmetto Limited, the Southland, and the South Wind. During the mid 1930s, the P-5-As were required to double head each other with ACL's passenger trains consist, which became longer and heavier with more than 12 passenger cars added due to the increased traffic of passengers traveled to Florida and ACL's competition with the Seaboard Air Line (SAL) and Southern (SOU) railroads. 

When the ACL railroad dieselized its passenger trains in the late 1940s, No. 1504 and the other P-5-As were used in main line freight service where they hauled 50-60 freight cars at maximum allowable speeds. No. 1504 hauled freight trains in the Tampa, Florida area until its retirement from revenue service on December 31, 1952.

Preservation and display

ACL president Champion Davis ordered ACL Mechanical Department manager John W. Hawthorne to spare No. 1504 from the scrap line for preservation. In June 1960, the No. 1504 locomotive was mechanically overhauled and put on static display in front of ACL's new headquarter building in Jacksonville, Florida. Additionally, it was the only USRA Light Pacific steam locomotive to be preserved in original as-built condition, excluding its headlight, tender trucks, and pilot wheels.

In October 1986, ACL's successor, CSX donated the No. 1504 locomotive to the Jacksonville City Council, where they relocated it to its new static display site in the parking lot of the Prime F. Osborn III Convention Center, located at the former Jacksonville Union Terminal. On October 23, 1990, No. 1504 was designated as a National Historic Mechanical Engineering Landmark by the American Society of Mechanical Engineers (ASME). It was renovated two times in 1989 and 1998.

In July 2013, the North Florida Chapter of the National Railway Historical Society (NRHS) launched the Project Return to Glory group to fund the cosmetic restoration of the No. 1504 locomotive, which had been sitting on display with faded paint due to its exposure to the elements. When No. 1504 was being inspected, it was discovered to be in fair condition, excluding its tender. 

In late October 2013, the North Florida Chapter NRHS received $10,000 from Trains Magazine and an additional $10,000 from CSX Corporation with a total of $20,000. The cosmetic restoration work would include adding new cab windows and doors, and renovating the headlamp. In July 2015, the Project Return to Glory group volunteers finished cosmetically restoring the No. 1504 locomotive with new paint. On January 23, 2018, No. 1504 was listed on the National Register of Historic Places.

Return to operating service
In June 2021, the Jacksonville City Council donated the No. 1504 locomotive to the North Florida Chapter NRHS, who would eventually sell the locomotive for $50,000 to U.S. Sugar Corporation (USSC) for use in excursion service on the South Central Florida Express shortline railroad in Clewiston, Florida as part of USSC's Sugar Express tourist passenger train. In late August 2021, No. 1504 was disassembled from static display and moved to the former Lucey Boiler Company building in Chattanooga, Tennessee, the same place where Southern Railway 4501 was originally restored in the mid 1960s. No. 1504 is currently undergoing an extensive three-year operational restoration and rebuild performed by FMW Solutions. Once it is fully restored to operating condition, No. 1504 will eventually run alongside another 4-6-2 steam locomotive, ex-Florida East Coast Railway (FEC) No. 148.

See also
Atlanta and West Point 290
Baltimore and Ohio 5300
Maine Central 470
Norfolk and Western 578
Pennsylvania Railroad 1361
Southern Railway 1401

Notes

References

Bibliography

External links

The History of Engine No. 1504 - Sugar Express

4-6-2 locomotives
ALCO locomotives
Atlantic Coast Line Railroad
Historic Mechanical Engineering Landmarks
Individual locomotives of the United States
Passenger locomotives
Preserved steam locomotives of Florida
Railway locomotives introduced in 1919
Standard gauge locomotives of the United States
Steam locomotives of the United States
USRA locomotives